The Premier of the Western Cape is the  head of government of the Western Cape province of South Africa. The current Premier of the Western Cape is Alan Winde, a member of the Democratic Alliance, who was elected in the 2019 election. He took office on 22 May 2019.

Functions
In terms of the provincial constitution, the executive authority of the province is vested in the Premier. The Premier appoints the Provincial Cabinet made up of ten members of the provincial parliament; they are known as Provincial Ministers. The Premier has the ability to appoint and dismiss Provincial Ministers at his/her own discretion.

The Premier and the Provincial Cabinet are responsible for implementing provincial legislation, along with any national legislation assigned to the province. They set provincial policy and manage the departments of the provincial government; their actions are subject to the national constitution and the provincial constitution.

In order for an act of the provincial parliament to become law, the Premier must sign it. If he/she believes that the act is unconstitutional, it can be referred back to the provincial parliament for reconsideration. If the Premier and the provincial parliament cannot agree, the act must be referred to the Constitutional Court for a final decision.

The Premier is also ex officio a member of the National Council of Provinces, the upper house of Parliament, as one of the special delegates from the province.

List

Election
The election for the Western Cape Provincial Parliament is held every five years, simultaneously with the election of the National Assembly; the last such election occurred on 8 May 2019. At the first meeting of the provincial parliament after an election, the members choose the Premier from amongst themselves. The provincial parliament can force the Premier to resign by a motion of no confidence. If the Premiership becomes vacant (for whatever reason) the provincial parliament must choose a new Premier to serve out the period until the next election. One person cannot have served more than two five-year terms as Premier; however, when a Premier is chosen to fill a vacancy the time until the next election does not count as a term.

The following table details the election results for the Premier on the first sitting of the Sixth Provincial Parliament held on 22 May 2019.

See also
 Politics of the Western Cape
 Premier (South Africa)
 President of South Africa
 Politics of South Africa

References

External links
 Official website

 
Government of the Western Cape